Taganay is a group of mountain ridges in the Southern Urals, on the territory of Chelyabinsk Oblast, with the highest point rising 1178 m. above sea level. Taganay National Park was established in 1991, with its south-western border reaching down to the outskirts of Zlatoust.

The vast majority of the park is covered with forests of Siberian spruce, pine, larch, aspen, willow, lime and alder. Over 750 species of plants have been recorded, some of which are listed in the Red Book. This is also home to many animal species, wolves, lynxes, brown bears, martens, moose and otters. The park is also home to about 180 species of birds, 55 species of mammals and 10 species of fish. Some of them are also recorded in the Red Book.

Climate and weather

References

External links
National Park Taganay official website (Russian)
National Park Taganay on Wikimapia

National parks of Russia
Protected areas established in 1991
Mountain ranges of Russia
Geography of Chelyabinsk Oblast
Landforms of Chelyabinsk Oblast
Tourist attractions in Chelyabinsk Oblast
1991 establishments in Russia